The Schumacher Center for a New Economics (formerly the E. F. Schumacher Society) is a tax exempt nonprofit organization based in Great Barrington, Massachusetts.

The Schumacher Center promotes the 'new economy', which includes the concepts buy local, local currency and self-sufficiency. The Schumacher Center aims to combine theoretical research with practical application at the local, regional, national, and international levels.  Further, the use of transformative systems and clear communication are part of its principles.

History

E F Schumacher Society
The Schumacher Center was founded as the E.F. Schumacher Society in 1980 by Robert Swann and Susan Witt.

Its aim was to preserve Schumacher's personal library and continue his work, which focused on developing and promoting regional, sustainable and socially just economics. To further its aims the organization began hosting annual lectures in 1981.

A library was established in 1990 as a research center for alternative economics.  In 1994, E F Schumacher's personal library and archives were donated to it.

Rename
In 2012 the Schumacher Center for a New Economics was formed to receive and manage the assets of the E. F. Schumacher Society and to manage and further develop its legacy programs.

Projects

Schumacher Library 
A library was established in 1990 as a research center for alternative economics. In 1994 Vreni Schumacher donated Fritz's personal library and archives. The library has about fifteen thousand books. The library building is 2,000 square foot, located on the side of Jug End Mountain in the Berkshire region of Massachusetts. Topics covered by the library include worker ownership, community supported agriculture, local currencies, the commons, and appropriate technology.  Its catalogue is searchable online.

Local Currencies
The center has resources about local currencies and helped set up the BerkShare. It maintains a list of active local currencies in the United States. In 2004 it held the Local Currencies in the 21st Century conference which as reported by the Utne Reader. In September 2013 Alice Maggio, the Schumacher Center's Local Currency Program Director, was interviewed for PBS's News Hour program.

BerkShares 

BerkShares is a local currency in Berkshire region of Massachusetts. In 2007 over eight hundred thousand BerkShares where in circulation.  The program promotes collaboration among producers, retail businesses, non-profit organizations, service providers and consumers. Additionally, it is designed to increase public awareness of the importance of the local economy and self-sufficiency. The New York Times referred to the BerkShares program as a "great socioeconomic experiment."

SHARE Micro-credit Program 
The Self-Help Association for a Regional Economy (SHARE) is a model community-based nonprofit that offers a simple way for citizens to create a sustainable local economy by supporting businesses that provide products or services needed in the region. SHARE makes micro-credit loans available at manageable interest rates to businesses that are often considered "high risk" by traditional lenders—usually because of their credit ratings or the unique nature of their business ideas. Local SHARE members make interest-earning deposits in a local bank, which are used to collateralize loans for local businesses with a positive community impact. SHARE depositors live in the same community as the business owners they support—bringing a human face back to lending decisions. The SHARE program of the Southern Berkshire region existed from 1981 to 1992, and collateralized 23 loans with a 100% rate of repayment.

Community Land Trusts 
Robert Swann, founder of the E.F. Schumacher Society, is known as a pioneer of the community land trust movement. The E.F. Schumacher Society provided technical assistance towards the formation of the Community Land Trust in the Southern Berkshires in 1980.

E.F. Schumacher Lectures 
From 1981 to the present, the E. F. Schumacher Society and now the Schumacher Center for a New Economics have hosted an annual lecture in honor of E.F. Schumacher. The E.F. Schumacher Lectures capture some of the most visionary voices regarding the urgent need to transform our economic, social, and cultural systems in a way that supports both the planet and its citizens. Past presenters include:

 Gar Alperovitz
 Donald Anderson
 Benjamin Barber
 Dan Barber
 Peter Barnes
 Chris Bedford
 Thomas Berry
 Wendell Berry
 Elise Boulding
 David Brower
 Christopher Houghton Budd
 Majora Carter
 Marie Cirillo
 David Ehrenfield
 William Ellis
 Sally Fallon Morell
 John Fullerton
 Chellis Glendinning
 Edward Goldsmith
 Neva Goodwin
 Hunter Hannum
 Alanna Hartzok
 Richard Heinberg
 Hazel Henderson
 Ivan Illich
 Dana Lee Jackon
 Wes Jackson
 Jane Jacobs
 Andrew Kimbrell
 David Korten
 Winona LaDuke
 Anna Lappé
 Frances Moore Lappé
 Thomas Linzey
 Amory Lovins
 Kevin Lyons
 Oren Lyons
 Jerry Mander
 John McClaughry
 Bill McKibben
 John McKnight
 George McRobie
 Deborah Meier
 Stephanie Mills
 Stacy Mitchell
 John Mohawk
 George Monbiot
 David Morris
 Helena Norberg-Hodge
 Richard Norgaard
 David W. Orr
 Will Raap
 Kirkpatrick Sale
 William Schambra
 Michael H. Shuman
 Cathrine Sneed
 James Gustave Speth
 Joseph Stanislaw
 Robert Swann
 John Todd (Canadian biologist)
 Nancy Jack Todd
 Chuck Turner
 Jakob von Uexkull
 Stewart Wallis
 Greg Watson
 Judy Wicks
 Susan Witt
 Arthur Zajonc

In 1997, Yale University Press published People, Land, and Community a collection of the annual lectures. According to the magazine Kirkus Reviews, the book "address(es) Schumacher's call for small-scale economies and policies."

Criticism
In August 2011 the National Catholic Register criticized the society for under playing the influence of the Catholic church on Schumacher, in particular Paul VI's Humanae Vitae.

See also

 Buddhist economics
 Community organizing
 Open Source Ecology
 Satish Kumar - involved in founding the society
 Schumacher College
 Small is beautiful
 Transition Towns

References

External links
 Schumacher Center For a New Economics
 Community Land Trust in the Southern Berkshires

Sustainability organizations
Non-profit organizations based in Massachusetts
Great Barrington, Massachusetts
Economics libraries
Think tanks established in 1980
Political and economic think tanks in the United States